Resurrection of Christ is a 1475–1479 painting by Giovanni Bellini. It was produced for the Marino Zorzi chapel in the mortuary church of San Michele di Murano in Venice. It has previously been attributed to Cima da Conegliano, Previtali, Bartolomeo Veneto and Marco Basaiti. It was acquired by the Gemäldegalerie, Berlin in 1903 and a full restoration shortly afterwards confirmed its attribution to Bellini.

References

1470s paintings
Paintings by Giovanni Bellini
Paintings in the Gemäldegalerie, Berlin
Bellini